Ahmadu Ibrahim Bello , Sardauna of Sokoto (12 June 1910 – 15 January 1966), knighted as Sir Ahmadu Bello, was a conservative Nigerian statesman who masterminded Northern Nigeria through the independence of Nigeria in 1960 and served as its first and only premier from 1954 until his assassination in 1966, in which capacity he dominated national affairs for over a decade.

He was also the leader of the Northern People's Congress, the ruling party at the time consisting of the Hausa–Fulani elite. He had previously been elected into the regional legislature and later became a government minister. A member of the Sokoto Caliphate dynasty, he made attempts at becoming Sultan of Sokoto before later joining politics.

Early years
Bello was born in Rabah c. 1910 to the family of Mallam Ibrahim Bello. His father held the title of Sarkin Rabah. He was a descendant of Uthman dan Fodio (founder of the Sokoto Caliphate), a great-grandson of Sultan Muhammad Bello, and a grandson of Sultan Atiku na Raba.

He received Islamic education at home, where he learnt the Qur'an, Islamic jurisprudence and the traditions of Muhammad. He later attended Sokoto Provincial School and the Katsina Training College (now Barewa College). During his school days, he was known as Ahmadu Rabah. Some also called him Gamji growing up He finished school in 1931 and subsequently became the English teacher in Sokoto Middle School.

In 1934, Bello was made the District Head of Rabah by Sultan Hassan dan Mu'azu, succeeding his brother. In 1938, he was promoted to the position of Divisional Head of Gusau (in present-day Zamfara State) and became a member of the Sultan's council. In 1938, at the age of just 28, he made attempts to become the Sultan of Sokoto but was not successful, losing to Sir Siddiq Abubakar III who reigned for 50 years until his death in 1988.

The new Sultan immediately made Sir Ahmadu Bello the Sardauna (Crown Prince) of Sokoto, a chieftaincy title, and promoted him to the Sokoto Native Authority Council. These titles automatically made him the Chief Political Adviser to the Sultan. Later, he was put in charge of the Sokoto Province to oversee 47 districts and by 1944, he was back at the Sultan's Palace to work as the Chief Secretary of the State Native Administration.

Early political career 

In the 1940s, he joined Jamiyya Mutanen Arewa which would later become the Northern People's Congress (NPC) in 1951. In 1948, he traveled to England on a government scholarship to study Local Government Administration, which broadened his understanding and knowledge of governance.

Young politician 
After returning from Britain, he was nominated to represent the province of Sokoto in the regional House of Assembly. As a member of the assembly, he was a notable voice for northern interests and embraced a style of consultation and consensus with the major representatives of the northern emirates namely Kano, Bornu and Sokoto. He was selected among with others as a member of a committee that redrafted the Richards Constitution and he also attended a general conference in Ibadan. His work at the assembly and in the constitution drafting committee brought him appreciation in the north and he was asked to take on leadership positions within Jamiyya Mutanen Arewa. In the first elections held in Northern Nigeria in 1952, Sir Ahmadu Bello won a seat in the Northern House of Assembly, and became a member of the regional executive council as minister of works. Bello was successfully minister of Works, of Local Government, and of Community Development in the Northern Region of Nigeria. In 1954, Bello became the first Premier of Northern Nigeria.

Independence of Nigeria 
In the 1959 independence elections, Bello led the NPC to win a plurality of the parliamentary seats. Bello's NPC forged an alliance with Dr. Nnamdi Azikiwe's NCNC (National Council of Nigeria and the Cameroons) to form Nigeria's first indigenous federal government which led to independence from Britain. In forming the 1960 independence federal government of the Nigeria, Bello as president of the NPC, chose to remain Premier of Northern Nigeria and devolved the position of Prime Minister of the Federation to the deputy president of the NPC, Abubakar Tafawa Balewa.

Premier of Northern Nigeria
Bello originally embraced the Indirect rule system of colonial Nigeria before gradually embracing reforms. During his period of premiership, his biographer, John Paden described him as a progressive conservative, because he was an agent of change and also of the traditional elites. Bello's leadership characteristics was a blend of religious, traditional and modern values and his obligation in colonial and post-independence Nigeria was performing these different roles in the northern region.

Northernisation 
Due to a limited number of qualified graduates from the region, Sir Ahmadu Bello instated the northernisation of the regions public service. Administration in the North was through indirect rule and Western education was not considered very important in many divisions. After the regionalization of the public service, political leaders in the region felt that the number of Northerners in the service was minimal in comparison to their counterparts in the South. Due to political considerations, leaders in the region limited the recruitment of Southerners into the Northern regional service and found ways to push up the ranks of northerners in junior and senior position.

The leaders retained the services of expatriates,  because Northerners regarded expatriates as transients but feared southern domination of the regional civil service. Measures were put in place to train northerners; in 1949, a scholarship board provided grants to almost all Northerners with qualifications to enter universities. In 1957, administration courses were taught at the Institute of Administration in Zaria. Apart from trying to fill positions in the civil service with Northerners, political leaders in the zone also made it a priority to secure Northern representation in senior positions of the Federal service.

Economy
Various institutions were created under Bello, including the Northern Nigeria Development Corporation (NNDC), Bank of the North and Northern Nigeria Investments Ltd (NNIL). NNDC was an holding company with capital sourced from the region's marketing board while NNIL was a partnership between the Commonwealth Development Corporation and NNDC created to assist in the industrial development in Northern Nigeria.

Education
Bello initiated plans to modernise traditional Koranic education in Northern Nigeria. He set up a commission to this effect and gave official recognition to the schools. The commission recommended the introduction of secular subjects in the schools and creation of different classes for pupils.

Part of his educational objectives was building a school in each province in Northern Nigeria.

Final years 
Bello's final years were characterized by his earlier years. A major priority of his was making sure the region was at par politically and economically with the Western and Eastern regions. This contributed to the decision to replace both Southerners and Europeans in the Northern region's civil services with Northerners, a policy that received criticism from opposition leaders such as Ibrahim Imam.

Coup warnings and predictions 
Prior to the 1966 Nigerian coup d'état, Bello received warnings from the Premier of the Western Region Samuel Akintola, and Brigadier Samuel Ademulegun.

Assassination 
On 15 January 1966, Bello was assassinated by Major Chukwuma Kaduna Nzeogwu an Igbo Nigerian Army officer in a coup which toppled Nigeria's post-independence government. He was still serving as premier of Northern Nigeria at the time. This was the first coup in the history of Nigeria, which heralded the rise of the military in the country's politics. Also assassinated in the coup was his long time friend Alhaji Sir Abubakar Tafawa Balewa alongside many political elites in the north and in the west.

Bello had three wives at the time of his death. Hafsatu, his senior wife, died alongside him. He had three surviving daughters with another wife, Amina (Goggon Kano). His eldest daughter was Inno, followed by Aisha and Lubabatu.

Legacy and memory 
Bello's greatest legacy was the modernization and unification of the diverse people of Northern Nigeria.

Reputation 
Ahmadu Bello believed that every Nigerian, and all human beings are created equally, that they are endowed by God with rights among which are life, liberty, equal opportunity, blessings and the legitimate pursuit of happiness. Throughout his political career and before, he espoused high morality and intellectual virtues.

Place names
A number of localities and monuments around the country have been named in Sardauna's honour. They include:

 The Ahmadu Bello University in Zaria is named after him.
 His portrait adorns the 200 naira banknote.

Gallery

See also

 Nigerian First Republic

Further reading

Ahmadu Bello; My Life, Cambridge University Press, 1962.

References

Citations

Cited sources

External links
 200 Naira note
 Sir Ahmadu Bello, and Muhammadu Sanusi I Visiting the United Nations, New York City, July 1960
 The Sardauna of Sokoto Hosting UK Prime Minister Harold Macmillan in Northern Nigeria, January 1960
Sardauna Hosts Princess Alexandra at Sokoto Durbar | Independence Celebrations | Oct. 1960

1910 births
1966 deaths
Nigerian recipients of British titles
Knights Commander of the Order of the British Empire
Politicians from Sokoto State
Nigerian knights
Nigerian Muslims
Nigerian royalty
Assassinated Nigerian politicians
People murdered in Nigeria
Northern People's Congress politicians
20th-century Nigerian politicians
People from colonial Nigeria
Dan Fodio family
1966 murders in Nigeria
Nigerian Fula people
Nigerian people of Arab descent
African people of Arab descent
People of Arab descent